ERT Digital was a pilot project by ERT, the  public broadcaster of Greece. It was the first legal attempt at digital television broadcasting in Greece, featuring four new channels: Cine+, Prisma+ Sport+ and Info+. It was officially launched in early 2006 as part of the digital television transition mandated by the European Union. The project was funded through ERT's budget and had no advertising.

In the initial phase of the program, each channel was to broadcast between six and ten hours of original programming. This would last approximately 1–2 years in which time it was anticipated that new programming would be produced for each channel. ERT also hoped to launch at least two more digital channels at some point in the future, a lifestyle channel and a children's channel. The programming on the four digital channels was separate and distinct from that featured on ERT's three traditional analogue services - ΕΤ1, ΝΕΤ and ΕΤ3.

ERT Digital was available to approximately 65% of the population, mainly in Athens, Thessaloniki and some other major cities. It broadcast free-to-air without any subscription cost, requiring only a generic DVB-T set-top box. The issue of paying for the four digital channels had been a bone of contention for many Greek citizens as ERT was funded by a fee levied on all Greek households through their electricity bills. Some contended that they should not have to pay for a service they might not be able to receive or did not want to watch.

Programming

Cine+
Cine+ (Σινέ+) features international & Greek films, cultural programmes and documentaries, mainly taken from ERT's vast programming archive. It also houses Studio+, a music show featuring Greek and international videos, that is planned to later reform to a full separate channel. Upon the launch of ERT HD in April 2011, Cine+ was merged with Sport+ before being replaced by BBC World News in March 2012.

Prisma+
Prisma+ (Πρίσμα+) focused on entertainment as well as news & education. It is the fifth channel in Greece (it launched on 20 March 2006). It had been planned to be the first TV channel that was fully accessible to people with disabilities. Prisma+ broadcasts a programme with a variety of emissions and films. The majority of its programmes, unlike its sister channels is subtitled via teletext service. Prisma+ broadcasts 24 hours a day, but its main programming is from 1:00 p.m. to 12:00 at midnight. The rest of the programming were reruns. It was replaced on its frequency by Deutsche Welle in March 2012.

Sport+
Sport+ (Σπορ+) was a sports channel covering live sporting events - mainly association football and basketball, but also other less popular sports. NBA TV programmes were regularly featured. Sport+ was merged with Cine+ in April 2011.

Info+
Info+ was a news channel and the final addition to ERT Digital. It occupied the same frequency as Sport+, in alternating timeslots. Info+ also functioned as a testbed for DVB-MHP.

RIK Sat
RIK Sat was also offered on the same frequency, accounting as the temporary fourth channel of the bouquet.

Hellenic Broadcasting Corporation
Defunct television channels in Greece
Television in Greece
Digital television
Television channels and stations established in 2006
2006 establishments in Greece